The 2012 Bonnaroo Music Festival was held June 7–10, 2012 in Manchester, Tennessee, United States, and marked the 11th time the festival has been held since its inception in 2002.

On March 12, six more artists were added to the line up. Danzig Legacy (featuring music by Danzig, Samhain and Danzig/Doyle performing The Misfits), The Temper Trap, Santigold, Puscifer, fun. and The Cave Singers.

The Festival announced on April 11 that four more artists would be added to the lineup: Rodrigo y Gabriela and C.U.B.A., the Sam Bush Band, Michael Kiwanuka and Black Box Revelation. Phish also played a second full set. Attendance at the 2012 festival surpassed 100,000, a record for Bonnaroo.

Line-up

Thursday, June 7

(artists listed from earliest to latest set times)

This Tent:
The Dirty Guv'nahs
The Lonely Forest
Danny Brown
Yelawolf
Kendrick Lamar
Alabama Shakes
That Tent:
K.Flay
Mariachi El Bronx
Orgone
Moon Taxi
SOJA
Big Gigantic
The Other Tent:
EMA
The Cave Singers
Dale Earnhardt Jr. Jr.
White Denim
Phantogram
MiMosa
The Bonnaroo Comedy Theatre:
CC: Stand-Up: The Bonnaroo Experience (2 sets)
Brian Posehn, Pete Holmes, Kyle Kinane & Ali Wong (2 sets)
The Chris Gethard Show
The Great Taste Lounge Brewed by Miller Lite
Fort Atlantic
Rollin' in the Hay
Water Knot
The Casey Driessen Singularity
Hudost
MonstrO
Marina Orchestra
Glossary
Cherub
The Solar Stage:
The Apple Butter Express
Breakdancing
Rubblebucket
The Flavor Savers: Beard & Mustache Contest
The Dirty Guv'nahs
Ogya
The Carnivalesque Cabaret- Burlesque, Bellydance & Sideshow
Cinema Tent:
Bad Brains: Band in DC
Green Screens Presented by Rock The Earth: Chasing Ice - Q&A with director Jeff Orlowski
SF Sketchfest Presents: The Doug Benson Movie Interruption of Crank: High Voltage – Doug Benson & Friends
[adult swim] presents: things you've never seen
NBA East Finals Game 6
Laurel & Hardy Shorts – Live Score Performed by Steven Bernstein’s MTO
God Bless America - Q&A with director/screenwriter Bobcat Goldthwait
Trapped in the Closet Sing-Along! – Hosted by Henri Mazza
The Silent Disco powered by Philips Citiscape Collection 
DJ XSV
K-Flay (DJ Set)
DJ Equal
Jared Dietch / Quickie Mart

Friday, June 8

What Stage:
The Soul Rebels
Sharon Jones & The Dap-Kings
The Avett Brothers
Rodrigo y Gabriela and C.U.B.A.
Radiohead
Which Stage:
The Kooks
Needtobreathe
AfroCubism
Feist
Foster the People
This Tent:
Electric Guest
Tune-Yards
Two Door Cinema Club
Little Dragon
Ludacris
Major Lazer
Umphrey's McGee
That Tent:
Michael Kiwanuka
Ben Howard
Laura Marling
Fitz and the Tantrums
St. Vincent
Black Star
Flying Lotus
The Other Tent:
Steven Bernstein's MTO Plays SLY
The Infamous Stringdusters
Sam Bush
Trampled By Turtles
Dawes
The Word (John Medeski, Robert Randolph, North Mississippi Allstars)
Ivan Neville's Dumpstaphunk
Big Freedia
The Bonnaroo Comedy Theatre:
Colin Hay, Garfunkel & Oates, Mike O'Connell
Marc Maron, World Champion Judah Friedlander, & Amy Schumer
Aziz Ansari & Rory Scovel (2 sets)
CC: Stand-Up: The Bonnaroo Experience
Café Where:
Paladino
Claire and the Reasons
Chappo
The Deep Dark Woods
The Great Taste Lounge Brewed by Miller Lite:
Shahidah Omar
Trixie Whitley
Katie Herzig
Caitlin Rose
Hey Rosetta!
Oberhofer
Sara Watkins
Pujol
Rubblebucket
Valient Thorr
Sonic Stage:
Dale Earnhardt Jr. Jr.
The Dirty Guv'nahs
Moon Taxi
Rubblebucket
Colin Hay
The Soul Rebels
Punch Brothers
Ben Howard
AfroCubism
The Infamous Stringdusters
The Solar Stage:
Dub Kartel
Katie Herzig:RtE Interview / Performance
SOJA: RtE Interview / Performance
RtE Panel Discussion re: NOLA Ivan Neville, etc.
Rubblebucket: RtE Interview / Performance
The Infamous Stringdusters: RtE Interview & Performance
The Flavor Savers: Beard & Mustache Contest
DJ TableSaw
Robert Ellit
Hula Hoopers LED
Breakdancing
The Carnivalesque Cabaret- Burlesque, Bellydance & Sideshow
Cinema Tent:
Green Screens Presented by Rock The Earth: The Big Fix - Intro by Ivan Neville of Dumpstaphunk
Special Advance Screening: Hit and Run – Q&A with Dax Shepard & Kristen Bell
SF Sketchfest Presents The Doug Benson Movie Interruption of Rambo (2008 version) - Doug Benson & Friends Live
Buster Keaton Shorts - Live Score Performed by Tune-Yards and Ava Mendoza
Green Screens Presented by Rock The Earth: The Island President - Intro by Bob Ferguson of Oxfam America
[adult swim] presents: things you've never seen
Marley
Tim and Eric's Billion Dollar Movie
The Silent Disco powered by Philips Citiscape Collection 
K-Flay (DJ set)
DJ XSV
Mark Foster of Foster the People
DJ Equal / Quickie Mart
Jared Dietch / Wyllys

Saturday, June 9
What Stage:
Charles Bradley and His Extraordinaires
The Temper Trap
Santigold
The Roots
Red Hot Chili Peppers
Which Stage:
The Devil Makes Three
Blind Pilot
Punch Brothers
Childish Gambino
Dispatch
Skrillex
This Tent:
Darondo
Das Racist
Battles
SBTRKT
Mogwai
Superjam ft. ?uestlove and very special guests
GZA performing "Liquid Swords" backed by Grupo Fantasma
That Tent:
Pelican
Bad Brains
Flogging Molly
Puscifer
DANZIG LEGACY - featuring music by Danzig, Samhain and Danzig/Doyle performing The Misfits
Alice Cooper
Unchained "The Mighty Van Halen Tribute"
The Other Tent:
Janka Nabay & the Bubu Gang
Debo Band
Khaira Arby & Her Band
La-33
Red Baraat
Spectrum Road ( Cindy Blackman Santana, Jack Bruce, John Medeski, and Vernon Reid)
Pedrito Martinez Group
The Bonnaroo Comedy Theatre:
Colin Hay, Garfunkel & Oates, Mike O'Connell
Marc Maron, Judah Friedlander, & Amy Schumer
Rhys Darby & Reggie Watts
Steven Wright & Glenn Wool
Café Where:
Bhi Bhiman
Sister Sparrow & the Dirty Birds
Jukebox the Ghost
James Wallace & the Naked Light
The Great Taste Lounge Brewed by Miller Lite:
The Main Squeeze
Cosmic Suckerpunch
Wild Cub
LP
Tauk
Chuck Mead
Robert Ellis
The Stooges Brass Band
WE ARE AUGUSTINES
Art vs. Science
Sonic Stage:
The Casey Dreissen Singularity
Trixie Whitley
Dawes
Hey Rosetta!
Trampled by Turtles
Oberhofer
North Mississippi Allstars Duo
Gary Clark Jr.
Art vs. Science
The Stooges Brass Band
The Solar Stage:
Breakdancing
Dennis Casey & Bob Schmidt (Flogging Molly) -- RtE Interview
Chad Stokes(Dispatch), Matt Wilhelm (Calling All Crows) RtE interview/performance
ALO — RtE Interview & Performance
Red Baraat: RtE Interview & Performance
Hey Rosetta! RtE Interview & Performance
Andrea Bellanger
Mawre
Marina Orchestra
DJ TableSaw
Matt Sucich
The Carnivalesque Cabaret- Burlesque, Bellydance & Sideshow
Cinema Tent:
American Splendor - Q&A with actor Judah Friedlander
#ReGENERATION - Q&A with director Philip Montgomery and producer Matt DeRoss
Charles Bradley: Soul of America with Introduction by documentary subject Charles Bradley
Thugs, The Musical
When Groucho Met Alice: Duck Soup - Introduction by Alice Cooper
SF Sketchfest Presents: Freak Dance – Q&A with Matt Besser
[adult swim] presents: things you've never seen
SF Sketchfest Presents Reggie Watts + Surprise Silent Film - Live Score Performed by Reggie Watts
Girl Walk//All Day
The Silent Disco powered by Philips Citiscape Collection:
Wyllys
Penguin Prison / Body Language (DJ Set)
Brenton Duvall

Sunday, June 10

What Stage:
Gary Clark Jr.
The Beach Boys (Brian Wilson, Mike Love, Al Jardine, Bruce Johnston and David Marks)
Bon Iver
Phish
Which Stage:
Delta Spirit
The Black Lips
Mac Miller
Ben Folds Five
The Shins
This Tent: 
ALO
Grouplove
The War on Drugs
The Joy Formidable
Young the Giant
That Tent:
Black Box Revelation
Fruit Bats
Here We Go Magic
The Antlers
Kurt Vile and the Violators
fun.
The Other Tent:
Sarah Jarosz
Kathleen Edwards
City and Colour
Kenny Rogers
The Civil Wars
The Bonnaroo Comedy Theater:
Rhys Darby & Reggie Watts (2 sets)
Steven Wright & Glenn Wool
Café Where:
Matt Sucich
Robert Francis
Machines Are People Too
The Great Taste Lounge Brewed by Miller Lite:
Fly Golden Eagle
Honey Island Swamp Band
By Lightning!
The Silent Comedy
Yuna
The Staves
Bethesda
Sonic Stage:
Sister Sparrow & the Dirty Birds
Red Baarat
Blind Pilot
WE ARE AUGUSTINES
ALO
Kathleen Edwards
Here We Go Magic
Chappo
The Silent Comedy
Brownout
The Solar Stage:
Bhakti: RtE Interview & Performance
Stooges Brass Band RtE Interview & Performance
Honey Island Swamp Band: RtE Interview & Performance
Blind Pilot: RtE Interview & Performance
The Deep Dark Woods — RtE Interview & Performance
The Flavor Savers- Beard & Mustache Contest
Breakdancing
Andrea Bellanger
Cinema Tent:
Green Screens presented by Rock the Earth: Last Call at the Oasis – Q&A with Lindsay Guetschow and David Whiteside
SF Sketchfest Presents the Best of Upright Citizens Brigade Comedy hosted by Matt Besser
Finding North – Intro by the Civil Wars, and Lindsay Guetschow of Participant Media
Weird Science
Advance Screening: Beasts of the Southern Wild
The Silent Disco powered by Philips Citiscape Collection: 
Body Language (DJ set)

References

External links
Official website
Bonnaroo 2012 Technorati

Bonnaroo Music Festival by year
2012 in American music
2012 music festivals
Bonnaroo
2012 in Tennessee